Masixole 'Coyi' Banda (born 11 June 1988) is a South African rugby union player for the  in the Pro14. He can play as a fly-half, winger or fullback.

Career

Youth and amateur rugby

Banda played his school rugby at Ithembelihle High School, New Brighton until 2010 under the tutelage of Theo Pieterse, who guided the school to being named the School Team of the Year in 2012.

Banda was also named in the  squad for the 2009 Under-19 Provincial Championship competition and played for them at Under-21 level during the 2010 and 2011 Under-21 Provincial Championship seasons, making six starts. He was also included in an  side that played against the South Africa Under-20 side in 2011, scoring eleven points in a 31–16 defeat.

Banda then joined club side African Bombers.

Eastern Province Kings

In 2014, the  announced that several club players would join their wider training squad for the 2014 Vodacom Cup. Banda was included in the training squad and was subsequently included in their squad for the tournament.

After making five appearances in the Vodacom Cup competition, however, he was dropped for disciplinary reasons after he played in matches for club side African Bombers and not showing up for training sessions.

References

South African rugby union players
Living people
1988 births
Rugby union players from Port Elizabeth
Eastern Province Elephants players
Southern Kings players
Border Bulldogs players
Griquas (rugby union) players
Rugby union fly-halves